Samuele Bertinelli (born 21 March 1976) is an Italian politician. He is the former mayor of Pistoia, in office from 8 May 2012 to 26 June 2017, and a member of the Democratic Party. In 2012, he was a candidate for mayor of Pistoia, at the head of a center coalition, and was elected in the first round with 59% of the votes, against 16% collected by the center-right candidate, Anna Maria Ida Celesti. Bertinelli was born in Pistoia, Italy, graduated in philosophy, and engaged in politics at a very young age. He joined the Democrats of the Left at age 22 (1998) and was elected city councilor of Pistoia, becoming president of the culture committee. In the subsequent administration, from 2002 to 2007, he was re-elected and appointed leader of the Democrats of the Left in the municipal council.

References

External links 
 
 

Living people
1976 births
People from Pistoia
Democratic Party (Italy) politicians
21st-century Italian politicians
20th-century Italian politicians
Mayors of Pistoia